Novomykolaivka is an urban-type settlement in Kramatorsk Raion in Donetsk Oblast of eastern Ukraine. Population:

Demographics
Native language as of the Ukrainian Census of 2001:
 Ukrainian 69.49%
 Russian 30.51%

References

Urban-type settlements in Kramatorsk Raion